Zhang Yu (1343 – January 9, 1401), courtesy name Shimei, was a Ming dynasty general. He was born in Kaifeng, Henan Province. He supported Zhu Di Prince of Yan (the future Yongle Emperor) in the Jingnan Campaign against the Jianwen Emperor. In December 1398, he gathered a force of 800 of Zhu Di's supporters to protect the Prince of Yan's residence in Beiping. On December 25, 1400, Zhang and Zhu arrived in Dongchang (modern Liaocheng, Shandong Province). Two weeks later, he was killed in action against Jianwen's forces led by Sheng Yong, while trying to break Zhu out of an encirclement that they had been lured into.

References
《明史》（卷145）：“张玉，字世美，祥符人。仕元为枢密知院。元亡，从走漠北。洪武十八年来归。从大军出塞，至捕鱼儿海，以功授济南卫副千户，迁安庆卫指挥佥事。又从征远顺、散毛诸洞。北逐元人之扰边者，至鸦寒山还，调燕山左护卫。从燕王出塞，至黑松林。又从征野人诸部。以骁果善谋画为王所亲任。”
1343 births
1401 deaths
Ming dynasty generals
People from Kaifeng